Dennheritz is a municipality in the district Zwickau, in Saxony, Germany.

Mayors 

Since August 2009: Frank Taubert, reelected in 2016 
2004-2009: Bernd Voigt

References 

Zwickau (district)